Live Session may refer to:

Live Session EP (iTunes Exclusive), a 2009 release by 3OH!3
Live Session, a 2008 released by Alessi's Ark
Live Session (iTunes Exclusive) (Blakes EP), released in 2008
 Live Sessions (Bonobo EP), released in 2005
Live Session!,  a live album by Cannonball Adderley, released in 1964
Live Session (iTunes Exclusive), a 2006 release by Cat Power
Live Session EP (iTunes Exclusive), a 2008 released by City and Colour
 Live Sessions EP (Dami Im EP), released in 2019
The Live Sessions EP, a 2006 release by The Exit
Live Session (Goldfrapp EP), released in 2006
Live Session EP (iTunes Exclusive), a 2006 release by Imogen Heap
Live Session EP, a 2007 release by Jeremy Camp
Live Session EP (Josh Kelley), released in 2005
Live Session EP, a 2005 release by Lifehouse
 Live Sessions (Matt Hires EP), released in 2011
Live Session (Nelly Furtado EP), released in 2006
Live Session EP (iTunes Exclusive), a 2006 release by Panic! at the Disco
Live Session (iTunes Exclusive), a 2007 release by Papa Roach
Live Session, a 2007 release by Rodrigo y Gabriela
Live Session EP, a 2007 release by Sara Bareilles
Live Session EP (iTunes Exclusive), a 2006 release by The Weepies

See also
Live Recordings (disambiguation)
Live album